Hemanta Dutta is an Assamese, Indian dramatist, film director, and lyricist. Dutta was conferred with the title Bhaben Baruah Award in 2017.

Awards and nominations 
 Title of ‘Natyasindhu’ 
 Bhaben Baruah Award, 2017 conferred on Hemanta Dutta

List of plays

References 

Assamese people
21st-century Indian male actors
Living people
1942 births